Carême is a French surname. Notable people with the surname include:

Marie-Antoine Carême (1784–1833), French chef
Maurice Carême (1899–1978), Belgian poet
Marie-Rose Carême, French football manager
Baptiste Carême (born 1985), French badminton player

French-language surnames